Orna Ben-Ami (Hebrew: אורנה בן-עמי, born in 1953), is an Israeli sculptor and former journalist.

Early life 
Ben-Ami was born in Rehovot and was raised in Ashdod, Israel.

In 1971, she joined the service at IDF and became the first female military correspondent for the Army Radio station "Gallei Zahal". Following her military service, she became a reporter and news editor for the Israeli Broadcasting Authority radio station.

Career 
In 1998, Ben-Ami began to learn gold and silversmith at the Jerusalem Technological Center. She continued her studies in 1992 and enrolled in the Corcoran School of Art in Washington, D.C. where she studied sculpting.

In 2003, her exhibition, "Soft – Iron Sculpturing", was presented in seven museums around the United States, a museum in Taiwan and galleries in Paris and Rome. In 2005, she sculpted "Roots", which represented Israel in an international exhibition honouring 60 years of the United Nations in Geneva.

In 2017, her exhibition was hosted at United Nations headquarters in Geneva and New York City, under the title "Entire Life in a Package". The exhibition brought attention to the global refugee crisis. The exhibits were a combination of original "Reuters" photographs of refugees and iron sculpting.

Ben-Ami is married to Israeli journalist and broadcaster Oded Ben-Ami.

Selected solo exhibitions

Selected group exhibitions

Selected commissions and public sculptures

References 

Israeli sculptors
Israeli journalists
Israeli women sculptors
Israeli women journalists
1953 births
Living people